Michael Gerald Hastings (2 September 1938 – 19 November 2011) was a British playwright, screenwriter, and occasional novelist and poet.

He is best known for his 1984 stage play and 1994 screenplay Tom & Viv, about the poet T.S. Eliot and his wife Vivienne Haigh-Wood.

Biography
Hastings was born in London, UK.  His early plays – Don't Destroy Me (1956), Yes And After (1957) – reflected the influence of the Angry Young Men movement and his brief involvement with the circle surrounding Colin Wilson.

Hastings later enjoyed mainstream West End success with Gloo Joo (1978), a farce about a West Indian threatened with deportation from the United Kingdom, which won the Evening Standard Comedy of the Year Award in 1979.  He wrote numerous stage plays, television screen plays, and in addition to the Tom & Viv film, scripts for two motion pictures, The American (1998) and The Nightcomers (1971, based on the Henry James novella The Turn of the Screw and starring Marlon Brando).  Hastings also wrote two libretti for Michael Nyman: Man and Boy: Dada (2003, assisted by Victoria Hardie) and Love Counts (2005).

Hastings' 1950's play The Cutting of the Cloth saw its world premiere at the Southwark Playhouse in London, from 11 March till 4 April 2015. The cast were Alexis Caley, Andy de la Tour, James El-Sharawy, Paul Rider and Abigail Thaw, directed by Tricia Thorns.

Hastings published his first novel, The Game in 1957, followed by The Frauds. His 1970 novel Tussy Is Me – about Eleanor Marx – won him the Somerset Maugham Award. As a poet, he published one collection, Love Me, Lambeth, and Other Poems, in 1961, and his work appeared in Michael Horovitz's 1969 anthology Children of Albion: Poetry of the Underground in Britain.

Hastings died aged 73 on 19 November 2011.

Selected works

Theatre
Don't Destroy Me (1956)
Yes And After (1957)
The World's Baby (1964)
For the West (Congo) (1965)
Blue as His Eyes the Tin Helmet He Wore (1966)
Lee Harvey Oswald: A Far Mean Streak of Independence Brought on by Negleck (also known as The Silence of Lee Harvey Oswald) (1967)
The Silence of Saint-Just (1972)
The Cutting of the Cloth (written 1973)
For the West (Uganda) (1977)
Gloo Joo (1978)
Full Frontal (1979)
Carnival War a Go Hot (1979)
Murder Rap (1980)
Midnight at the Starlight (1980)
Tom & Viv (1984)
Calico (2004)

Television
Gloo Joo (1979)

Books
Fiction
The Game (1957)
The Frauds (1960)
Tussy Is Me (1970) 
The Nightcomers (1971; based on his own screenplay)
And in the Forest the Indians (1975)
Bart's Mornings and Other Tales of Modern Brazil (1975) (short stories)
Non-fiction
Rupert Brooke: The Handsomest Young Man in England (1967)
Sir Richard Burton: A Biography (1978)
Poetry
 Love Me, Lambeth, and Other Poems (1961)

References

External links
 
 Michael Hastings Papers at the Harry Ransom Center
 Profile at Doollee.com
 
 

1938 births
2011 deaths
20th-century English dramatists and playwrights
20th-century English male writers
People educated at Alleyn's School
English screenwriters
English male screenwriters
People from Brixton
English male dramatists and playwrights